Eetu-Ville Arkiomaa (born August 26, 1993) is a Finnish professional ice hockey player. He is currently playing for Espoo Blues of the Finnish Liiga.

Eetu-Ville Arkiomaa made his Liiga debut playing with SaPKo during the 2013–14 Liiga season.

Personal
Arkiomaa was born in Rauma, Finland, the son of Tero Arkiomaa who played professional ice hockey for 20 seasons throughout Europe. His uncle Tomi spent 15 seasons playing in the Finnish 2. Divisioona.

References

External links

1993 births
Living people
SaPKo players
Peliitat Heinola players
HPK players
Finnish ice hockey forwards
People from Rauma, Finland
Sportspeople from Satakunta